Zieria hydroscopica is a plant in the citrus family Rutaceae and is only known from a single state forest near Monto in Queensland. It is a small shrub with erect, wiry branches, three-part leaves and groups of large numbers of flowers, the groups smaller than the leaves and the flowers with four petals and four stamens. It is similar to Zieria smithii, differing only in the type of hairs on the branches and lower surface of the leaves.

Description
The leaves are composed of three narrow elliptic to narrow lance-shaped leaflets with the narrower end towards the base. Both sides of the leaflets are slightly hairy. Flowering occurs mainly in September and is followed by fruit which is a more or less glabrous capsule.

Taxonomy and naming
Zieria hydroscopica was first formally described in 2007 by Marco Duretto and Paul Forster from a specimen collected in the Coominglah State Forest near Monto. The description was published in Austrobaileya. The specific epithet (hydroscopica) is said to be derived from the Greek hydro-, meaning "water" and scopic, meaning "watcher", referring to specimens of this species often growing near waterholes. The proper words in ancient Greek for "water" and "watcher" are hydōr (ὕδωρ) and skopos (σκοπός).

A doctoral thesis has proposed, on the basis of DNA analysis, that this species is a hybrid between Z. smithii and Z. cytisoides.

Distribution and habitat
This zieria has been seen growing in open forest and near rocky creek beds in the Coominglah State Forest.

References

hydroscopica
Sapindales of Australia
Flora of Queensland
Taxa named by Marco Duretto
Plants described in 2007
Taxa named by Paul Irwin Forster